Brendan Patrick O'Connor (born 2 March 1962) is an Australian politician who has served as Minister for Skills and Training since 2022. He is a member of the Australian Labor Party (ALP) and has served in the House of Representatives since 2001. He held ministerial office in the governments of Kevin Rudd and Julia Gillard from 2007 to 2013, including as a member of cabinet from 2012 to 2013. He was a member of the shadow cabinet from 2013 to 2022.

Early life
O'Connor was born on 2 March 1962 in London, England. He is the son of Michael and Philomena O'Connor. His parents were both born in Ireland, his mother in Thurles and his father in Tralee. O'Connor was born with both Irish and British citizenship, renouncing the latter in the early 1980s. He acquired Australian citizenship by naturalisation in 1995 and renounced his Irish citizenship in 2001 in order to stand for parliament.

O'Connor arrived in Australia when he was six years old. He attended Aquinas College, Melbourne, and subsequently completed the degrees of Bachelor of Arts and Bachelor of Laws at Monash University. He also completed a diploma at Harvard University in the United States through the Harvard Trade Union Program.

Union movement
While at university, O'Connor worked as a researcher for the Municipal Employees Union. He was the assistant national secretary of the Australian Services Union from 1993 to 2001.

Early political involvement
A member of Labor Left, O'Connor is a member of the National Left faction of the Australian Labor Party and is a member of the Socialist Left faction of the Victorian branch of the Australian Labor Party. At the time of his endorsement for Burke in 2001 he was aligned with the 'Independent Left', a breakaway group from the Socialist Left. This group included Julia Gillard. O'Connor has been a close ally of Julia Gillard since they were both involved in student politics during the 1980s along with Michael O'Connor. In 2015 the Independent Left rejoined the Socialist Left.

Parliament

First terms (2001–2007)
At the 2001 election, O'Connor was elected as the Member for Burke, When the division was abolished by the 2003 redistribution, O'Connor successfully contested the new electoral division of Gorton at the 2004 election.

In December 2005, he was elected to the position of Chair of the Federal Labor Industrial Relations Taskforce in a caucus ballot. The Taskforce investigated the adverse effects of the Howard Government's WorkChoices legislation, a controversial package of industrial relations changes.

Shortly after the election of Kevin Rudd to the office of federal Labor leader and Leader of the Opposition on 4 December 2006, O'Connor was appointed Shadow Parliamentary Secretary for Industrial Relations.

Government (2007–2013)

Following the Labor victory at the 2007 federal election, Prime Minister Rudd announced that O'Connor would serve as the Minister for Employment Participation from 29 November 2007. As Minister he reformed the Job Network, replacing it with Job Services Australia. This streamlined seven separate employment services programs into a 'one-stop-shop' to provide job seekers with a more personalised service.

On 6 June 2009, O'Connor was announced as the Minister for Home Affairs in the First Rudd ministry, replacing Bob Debus who retired at the 2010 election. Following Labor's narrow victory, Prime Minister Julia Gillard allocated increased responsibilities to O'Connor. He became Minister for Home Affairs, Minister for Justice and Minister for Privacy and Freedom of Information. In this portfolio, O'Connor enacted several key policy reforms including: new and tougher laws to protect children from being procured and groomed online, achieving consensus for an R18+ video game classification after 10 years of debate at Standing Committee of Attorney-General; and introducing significant reforms of the anti-dumping regime in 20 years.

In December 2011, O'Connor became the Minister for Human Services and Minister Assisting for School Education.

On 5 March 2012, O'Connor was sworn in as Minister for Small Business, Minister for Housing and Minister for Homelessness. He was also promoted to Cabinet for the first time, becoming the first small business minister in Cabinet for more than a decade. In this role O'Connor introduced the first Australian Small Business Commissioner, on 2 January 2013. On 30 August 2012, O'Connor and the Council of Australian Governments released the Housing Supply and Affordability Reform report, proposing reforms to increase housing affordability in Australia.

On 4 February 2013, O'Connor was sworn in as Minister for Immigration and Citizenship. Following the June 2013 Labor leadership spill, O'Connor was appointed Minister for Employment and Minister for Skills and Training in the Second Rudd ministry.

Opposition (2013–2022)
After the ALP's defeat at the 2013 federal election, O'Connor was included in Bill Shorten's shadow cabinet. He was retained in shadow cabinet when Anthony Albanese succeeded Shorten as opposition leader after the 2019 election. O'Connor has held the portfolios of employment and workplace relations (2013–2019), special minister of state (2016), employment and industry (2019–2021), science (2019–2021), and small and family business (2019–2021). He succeeded Richard Marles as shadow minister for defence following a reshuffle in January 2021.

Government (2022–present)
Following the 2022 federal election, O'Connor was appointed Minister for Skills and Training in the Albanese ministry.

Personal life
O'Connor was married to Jodi Dack until her death from breast cancer in August 2018; she had first been diagnosed in 2012. The couple had one daughter together.

O’Connor lives in Keilor.

References

External links
 

|-

|-

|-

|-

|-

|-

|-

|-

|-

 

1962 births
People from London
Australian Labor Party members of the Parliament of Australia
Government ministers of Australia
Harvard Law School alumni
Irish emigrants to Australia
Gillard Government
Rudd Government
English emigrants to Australia
People who lost British citizenship
Naturalised citizens of Australia
Living people
Members of the Cabinet of Australia
Members of the Australian House of Representatives
Members of the Australian House of Representatives for Burke (1969–2004)
Members of the Australian House of Representatives for Gorton
Monash Law School alumni
Labor Left politicians
21st-century Australian politicians
People who lost Irish citizenship
Albanese Government
Politicians from Melbourne